Rajyasamacharam was the first newspaper in Malayalam. This was started by Hermann Gundert under the Christian missionaries of Basel Mission in June 1847 from Illikkunnu in Thalassery. Pashchimodayam was the second newspaper in Malayalam. It started in October 1847 from Thalassery. Deepika, the oldest Malayalam newspaper now in circulation, was established in 1887. Malayala Manorama, Mathrubhumi, Madhyamam, Deshabhimani, Janayugom, Siraj, Suprabhaatham, Janmabhumi, Chandrika, Kerala Kaumudi, General, Veekshanam, Madhyamam and Varthamanam, are major newspapers in Malayalam. Malayala Manorama holds the record for the largest-selling regional language newspaper in India. It is also the 11th most circulating newspaper in the world.

List of newspapers (in circulation)
Morning dailies

Evening dailies

List of newspapers (defunct)Al Ameen (edited and published by Mohammed Abdul Rahiman; 1929-1939)Deenabandhu (edited by V. R. Krishnan Ezhuthachan; 1941 - 1962)Kerala Mithram (edited by Kandathil Varghese Mappila and published by Devji Bhimji)Kerala Pathrika (edited by Chengalathu Kunhirama Menon; estd. 1885)Malayala Rajyam (edited by K. G. Shankar; estd. 1929)Mithavadi (edited by Moorkoth Kumaran, Mithavaadi Krishnan; estd. 1907)Paschimodayam (Hermann Gundert; estd. 1847)Rajyasamacharam (Hermann Gundert; 1847-1850)Swadeshabhimani (edited by Swadeshabhimani Ramakrishna Pillai and published by Vakkom Abdul Khadir Moulavi)Thejas'' (edited by P. Koya)

See also
 List of Malayalam-language periodicals
 List of newspapers in India
 List of newspapers in the world by circulation

References

External links
List of Malayalam newspapers
Top 10 Malayalam newspaper websites
Links to Malayalam newspapers and magazines

India
newspapers
Malayalam language newspapers
Malayalam
Malayalam